The 1939–40 Gauliga Bayern was the seventh season of the league, one of the 18 Gauligas in Germany at the time. It was the first tier of the football league system in  Bavaria (German:Bayern) from 1933 to 1945.

For 1. FC Nürnberg it was the fifth of seven Gauliga championships the club would win in the era from 1933 to 1944. The club qualified for the 1940 German football championship, where it was knocked out after finishing second in its group, behind group winner SV Waldhof Mannheim, and ahead of Stuttgarter Kickers and Kickers Offenbach.

The sixth edition of the Tschammerpokal, now the DFB-Pokal, saw holders 1. FC Nürnberg defeated 2–1 after extra time in the final by Dresdner SC.

Table
The 1939–40 season saw two new clubs in the league, VfR 07 Schweinfurt and FSV Nürnberg.

References

Sources

External links
 Das Deutsche Fussball Archiv  Historic German league tables

1939-40
1